Father Donal V. O'Sullivan (died 5 July 1916) was an Irish Catholic priest, and chaplain in the 1st Battalion Royal Irish Rifles in World War I.  He was killed aged 26, in Albert in France, on 5 July 1916, during the attack on Bouzincourt, a part of the Battle of the Somme. O'Sullivan was mortally wounded by shrapnel from a shell which exploded near him, while he ministering to a wounded English soldier, who survived the war. His brother Dr J. Ivo O'Sullivan KM served with the 5th Connaught Rangers, as a medic in the war, in Ypres, Salonika, Gallipoli, earning a Military Cross.

A Chalice owned by O'Sullivan, was presented to the St Joseph's Young Priests Society, by his Nephew Dr Ivo O'Sullivan.

Life
O'Sullivan was born to Dan and Hannah O'Sullivan of High Street, Killarney, Co. Kerry. He was educated in St Brendan's College, Killarney and St Patrick's College, Maynooth, and was ordained at Maynooth in 1914 for the Diocese of Kerry. He returned to St Brendan's to teach for 18 months, before becoming an army chaplain. O'Sullivan ministered to the 7th Battalion, Royal Munster Fusiliers, and kept a diary from the day he left Killarney for the war until his death. The soldier who had been ministered to by O'Sullivan when he was killed travelled to Killarney and met his mother Hannah.

Death
O'Sullivan is buried in Bouzincourt Communal Cemetery in the Somme. In 1927 the local priest in Kerry, wished to have O'Sullivan reinterred in a local graveyard, however his mother Hannah disagreed saying he would have wished to remain alongside the men to whom he ministered.  According to Tom Johnstone, who sources this to a letter from the curé of Bouzincourt to O'Sullivan's mother in the possession of the O'Sullivan family at Ballydowney House, Killarney, County Kerry, it was the curé who requested Mrs O'Sullivan's permission to reinter O'Sullivan beside a new calvary erected to replace the one destroyed in the war.  But reburial of the war dead was disallowed by the British government at that time, with the sole exception of the Tomb of the Unknown Warrior.

References

1890 births
1916 deaths
20th-century Irish Roman Catholic priests
Irish military chaplains
World War I chaplains
Clergy from County Kerry
People from Killarney
People educated at St Brendan's College, Killarney
Alumni of St Patrick's College, Maynooth
Royal Army Chaplains' Department officers
British Army personnel of World War I
British military personnel killed in the Battle of the Somme
Royal Ulster Rifles officers
Royal Munster Fusiliers officers